Sakthi may refer to:

 Sakthi (1972 film), a Malayalam film by Crossbelt Mani
 Sakthi (1980 film), a Malayalam film by Vijay Anand
 Sakthi (1997 film), a Tamil film
 Sakthi (2011 film), a Telugu film
 Sakthi (TV series), an Indian Tamil soap opera
 Sakthi Group, an Indian conglomerate company
 R. C. Sakthi (1940-2015), Indian filmmaker and actor

See also 
 Shakti (disambiguation)